Pauline Allen-Dean is a former banker in The Bahamas. She was the first woman to become manager of a commercial bank and the first woman to serve as managing director of a commercial bank.

Life 
Born Pauline Allen, she completed a diploma in banking from the Institute of Bankers in London in 1973. In 1983, she was named a fellow of the Chartered Institute of Bankers. She was elected president of the Bahamas Institute of Bankers in 1998.

Allen-Dean also served as deputy president of the Bahamas Red Cross society. She was also founding president of the Consumer Protection Association in The Bahamas and of the Women Against Rape association. For a time, she contributed a column "One Woman's Point of View" to the Nassau Guardian. In December 2011, she was named to the Public Service Commission of The Bahamas.

Pauline-Allen helped establish a 200-home community development with her brother Algernon Allen, a former member of the Bahamian cabinet.

References 

Living people
Year of birth missing (living people)
Bahamian bankers